Lutheria bi-beatricis is a species of flowering plant in the family Bromeliaceae. This species is endemic to Venezuela.

References

Tillandsioideae
Flora of Venezuela